The 1989 Special Honours in New Zealand was a Special Honours List, dated 6 February 1989, in which two appointments were made to the Order of New Zealand and one judge received a knighthood.

Order of New Zealand (ONZ)
Ordinary member
 The Right Reverend Manuhuia Augustus Bennett .
 Henry George Lang .

Order of the British Empire

Knight Grand Cross (GBE)
Civil division
 The Honourable Mr Justice Thomas Eichelbaum – Chief Justice of New Zealand.

References

Special honours
Special honours